Albert Katzenellenbogen (born January 15, 1863, in Krotoschin; died after August 1942, murdered near Minsk) was an important German legal advisor in banking and industry who was murdered in the Holocaust because of his Jewish heritage.

Life 
Katzenellenbogen came from an influential German Jewish family  whose origins are traced by American genealogist Neil Rosenstein as far back as the 15th century to Rabbi Meir Katzenellenbogen. He was married to Cornelia Josephine (Nelly) née Doctor. Since 1912 the couple lived in Königstein im Taunus in the "Oelmühlweg", where Albert Ullmann and Oskar Kohnstamm also lived as neighbors under the same address.

A lawyer by training, he was admitted to the bar in Frankfurt am Main in October 1891, and in July 1912 he was appointed a judicial councilor.

Katzenellenbogen served on the executive boards of banks, textile companies and chemical corporations in various German cities. He was chairman of the board of Mitteldeutsche Creditbank (Commerz- und Privat-Bank in Frankfurt), among others. In 1895 he became the bank's general counsel, in 1897 a member of the board of directors, and in 1903 a member of the board of management. After Commerzbank was founded, Katzenellenbogen was a member of its Board of Managing Directors from 1929 to 1930 and then of its supervisory board until 1937. One year before the bank was Aryanized, almost two thirds (64.5%) of Frankfurt bank mandates were approved by Jewish members of the supervisory board in which Katzenellenbogen was prominent.

Nazi persecution 
When the Nazis came to power in Germany in 1933, Katzenellenbogen was persecuted due to his Jewish heritage. He was forced out of his profession and positions, obliged to renounce his admission to the bar in October 1935. The property of the Katzenellenbogen family was Aryanized in 1940.

His wife died on April 19 as a result of a stroke.  Katzenellenbogen was deported from Frankfurt am Main to the Theresienstadt ghetto on August 18, 1942, and died in the Maly Trostinez Nazi extermination camp on August 25, 1942, on transport "Bc-942.

Katzenellenbogen's children were Grete Helene, Marta Sofie (1897-1984) and Adolf Katzenellenbogen (1901-1964). Adolf emigrated from Nazi Germany to America in 1939 and became the chairman of the department of fine arts at Johns Hopkins University.  Grete Helene (1893-1944), daughter-in-law of Otto Berndt, did not escape and died as a forced laborer in Frankfurt am Main on March 22, 1944. The family grave is located in the main cemetery in Frankfurt. Among Katzenellenbogen's grandchildren is American professor of chemistry John Katzenellenbogen.

Literature 

 Heinz Sturm-Godramstein: Juden in Königstein. Leben-Bedeutung-Schicksale. Königstein im Taunus, 1983.
 Hierin Anmerkung Nr. 25: Mitteilung von Herrn Dieter Berndt; ROSENSTEIN N.: The unbroken chain. New York 1976.

See also 

 The Holocaust
 German banks
 Aryanization

References

External links 

 Stolpersteine in Frankfurt am Main (Städtische Seite) retrieved 22 February 2020

People who died in Maly Trostenets extermination camp
1863 births
Theresienstadt Ghetto prisoners
German Jews who died in the Holocaust
19th-century German lawyers
German people who died in Nazi concentration camps
1942 deaths
Subjects of Nazi art appropriations
20th-century German lawyers